The following is a comparison of cloud-computing software and providers.

IaaS (Infrastructure as a service)

Providers

General

SaaS (Software as a Service)

General

Supported hosts

Supported guests

PaaS (Platform as a service)

Providers

Providers on IaaS 
PaaS providers which can run on IaaS providers ("itself" means the provider is both PaaS and IaaS):

References

Cloud computing
Cloud platforms
Computing comparisons